Charles W. Bates (1879–1929) was an American architect who practiced primarily in Wheeling, West Virginia, and was one of the region's most successful architects.  He mostly specialized in commercial and school buildings in the north Ohio River valley.

Born December 27, 1879, in Wheeling, Bates first attended the local public schools, then completed his education at the Linsly Military Institute. He studied architecture and engineering at the Armour Institute of Technology, in Chicago.  In Chicago, he worked for D. H. Burnham & Company and Horatio R. Wilson.  He then went to Pittsburgh, where he worked for several more architects before taking a job in the architectural department of the Pennsylvania Railroad.  Bates then went abroad, returning in 1907.  Upon his return, he established the firm of Rudolph & Bates with A. W. Rudolph in Altoona, central Pennsylvania.  This firm was dissolved a year later and Bates returned to Wheeling, where he remained for the rest of his life and career.

Bates was one of the region's leading architects, with his chief local competitor being the older Frederick F. Faris.  He designed many of the area's largest buildings, including four 10-story structures and the public library in Wheeling, and the high schools in a number of towns.  Overviews of his work were published in 1909 and 1912.

Selected works

1909
 Rose Hill School, Monroe St, Bellaire, Ohio

1910
 First United Presbyterian Church, 3358 Guernsey St, Bellaire, Ohio
Edward F. Stifel House (Edemar), 1330 National Rd, Wheeling, West Virginia
Wheeling Public Library (Old), 2100 Market St, Wheeling, West Virginia

1911 
 First Ward School, Belmont St, Bellaire, Ohio
 Westover School, East St, Westover, West Virginia

1912
 Cairo School, School St, Cairo, West Virginia
 Hawley Building, 1025 Main St, Wheeling, West Virginia

1913 
 Neuralgyline Building, 88 19th St, Wheeling, West Virginia
 Rodewig Building, 3127 Belmont St, Bellaire, Ohio

1914
 National Bank of West Virginia Building, 1201 Main St, Wheeling, West Virginia
  Morgantown High School, 300 Spruce St, Morgantown, West Virginia (demolished) 
 Peoples Savings Bank Building, 30 S 4th St, Martins Ferry, Ohio

1915
 Farmers and Merchants National Bank Building, 3195 Union St, Bellaire, Ohio
 Fenray Theatre, 21 S 4th St, Martins Ferry, Ohio (demolished)

1916 
 Claysville High School, Main St, Claysville, Pennsylvania (demolished)
 First National Bank Building, 1388 Main St, Smithfield, Ohio
 German Savings Bank Building, 103 S 4th St, Martins Ferry, Ohio
 
1917 
 Elm Junior High School, 808 Elm St, Martins Ferry, Ohio (demolished)
 Hoeveler Storage Warehouse, 750 S Millvale Ave, Pittsburgh, Pennsylvania
 Point Pleasant High School, 1200 Main St, Point Pleasant, West Virginia
 Yorkville School, Market St, Yorkville, Ohio

1918 
 Miller Avenue School, 734 Miller Ave, Clairton, Pennsylvania (demolished)
 Moundsville High School, Tomlinson Ave, Moundsville, West Virginia (demolished)

1919
 Bank of Morgantown (Citizens) Building, 265 High St, Morgantown, West Virginia
 Wellsville High School, Center St, Wellsville, Ohio

1920 
 Harding High School, Vine St, Fairport Harbor, Ohio.

1921
 12th Street Garage, 79-81 12th St, Wheeling, West Virginia
 Metropolitan Theatre, 371 High St, Morgantown, West Virginia

1922
 Colson Hall, West Virginia University, Morgantown, West Virginia
 Riley Law Building, 45 14th St, Wheeling, West Virginia
 Charles R. Shreve High School, Hanover St, Martins Ferry, Ohio

1923
 Clairton High School, Waddell Ave, Clairton, Pennsylvania (highly altered)

1924
  Central Union Trust Building, 40 14th St, Wheeling, West Virginia

1925
 Bellaire High School, 35th St, Bellaire, Ohio

1927
 Pythian Theatre, 1025 Chapline St, Wheeling, West Virginia

1928
 Cadiz High School, 440 E Market St, Cadiz, Ohio
 Capitol Theatre, 1015 Main St, Wheeling, West Virginia

1929 
 Bridgeport High School, W Bennett St, Bridgeport, Ohio

References

1879 births
1929 deaths
Architects from West Virginia
20th-century American architects
People from Wheeling, West Virginia
Linsly School alumni
Illinois Institute of Technology alumni
Pennsylvania Railroad people